Joseph Lee Henderson (born July 4, 1946) is an American former Major League Baseball pitcher.

Career
Henderson was drafted by the California Angels in the fifth round of the 1965 Major League Baseball draft.

Henderson is the uncle of former MLB outfielder Dave Henderson.

References

1946 births
Living people
Algodoneros de Unión Laguna players
American expatriate baseball players in Mexico
Baseball players from Mississippi
Chicago White Sox players
Cincinnati Reds players
El Paso Sun Kings players
Indianapolis Indians players
Indios de Ciudad Juárez (minor league) players
Iowa Oaks players
Knoxville Sox players
Major League Baseball pitchers
Mexican League baseball pitchers
Quad Cities Angels players
San Jose Bees players
Tucson Toros players
People from DeSoto County, Mississippi